In biology, testicondy in a species is the condition of having testicles situated within the abdomen as the normal anatomy of that species. Testicondy can be further classified into primary testicondy and secondary testicondy. The testes of marine mammals such as sirenians and cetaceans are testicond.

See also 
 Testicular descent

References 

Animal male reproductive system
Testicle